Spyridium erymnocladum is a species of flowering plant in the family Rhamnaceae and is endemic to South Australia. It is a low, woody shrub with linear leaves, and heads of about seven woolly-hairy flowers.

Description

Taxonomy
Spyridium erymnocladum was first formally described in 1995 by William Robert Barker in the Journal of the Adelaide Botanic Gardens from specimens collected near Karkarooka between Kielpa and Rudall in 1993. The specific epithet (erymnocladum) means "fenced branch", referring to the overlapping stipules that completely shield the branchlets.

Distribution

References

erymnocladum
Rosales of Australia
Flora of South Australia
Plants described in 1995
Taxa named by William Robert Barker